Hildesheimer is a German surname. Notable people with the surname include:

Azriel Hildesheimer (1820–1899), German rabbi  and founder of the Hildesheimer Rabbinical Seminary
Wolfgang Hildesheimer (1916–1991), German author (grandson of Azriel)

See also
Hildesheim, a city in Lower Saxony, Germany

German-language surnames